The Kitchener-Waterloo Granite Curling Club (branded as the KW Granite Club) is a curling club on Seagram Drive in Waterloo, Ontario.

History
The club was formed in 1927 as the Granite Club by the Athletic Association of Kitchener and Waterloo (AAKW), which was briefly called the Kitchener Curling Club. The club played on a five-sheet rink at 69 Agnes Street in Kitchener.  The AAKW had been formed by members of the clubs located at the corners of Erb and Regina streets in Waterloo and Gaukel Street in Kitchener (previously Berlin). Curling had been played at those clubs since the 1880s. The club adopted the name "Granite Club" to appeal to more than just curling. Artificial ice was added in 1928.

In 1928, the Kitchener Tennis Club built five courts next to the club, and in 1931 the K-W Badminton Club added an addition. From 1941 to 1948 the K-W Skating Club also called the Granite home, until moving to the Waterloo Memorial Arena. Also in 1948, a Ladies section was added to the club.

On May 8, 1955 a fire caused by careless children destroyed half the building, gutting the badminton club and some of the curling facilities. Damages totalled at $200,000. The club rebuilt and remained on Agnes Street until moving to its present location Waterloo in 2003. The badminton club remained on Agnes Street. The current Waterloo Park site of the Granite Club previously housed the K-W Skating Club before it relocated to RIM Park. Called the "Rink in the Park", the Granite Club officially opened the building to the public on September 30, 2003, in time for the annual curling season.

The club has hosted the 1980 World Junior Curling Championships, the 1969 and 1975 Canadian Mixed Curling Championship and the 2004 M&M Meat Shops Skins Game. The club also hosts the annual KW Fall Classic World Curling Tour event.

Provincial champions

References

External link
Official site

Curling clubs in Canada
Sport in Waterloo, Ontario
Sport in Kitchener, Ontario
Curling clubs established in 1927
1927 establishments in Ontario
Curling in Ontario
Sports venues in Waterloo, Ontario
Sports venues completed in 2003